Isaiah "Ike" Reese (born October 16, 1973) is an American sports radio host and former American football linebacker. After seven seasons with the Eagles that included a Pro Bowl selection after the Eagles' NFC championship 2004 season, Reese played for the Atlanta Falcons from 2005 to 2006. 

In 2008, Reese began a career in radio with Philadelphia sports station 94.1 WIP. He currently hosts the WIP's Afternoon Show.

Early life and college career
Born in Jacksonville, North Carolina, Reese was raised in Cincinnati, Ohio and attended Woodward High School in Cincinnati as a freshman before transferring to nearby Aiken High School.  Reese graduated from Aiken in 1993 and enrolled at Michigan State University. After redshirting his freshman year, Reese played for the Michigan State Spartans football team from the 1994 to 1997 seasons as a starter. Reese played under coach George Perles in 1994 and Nick Saban from 1995 to 1997. Reese finished his college career with 420 tackles, 10 sacks, 3 interceptions, 4 forced fumbles, and 5 fumble recoveries.

Professional career
Reese was drafted by the Philadelphia Eagles in fifth round of the 1998 NFL Draft.  He played for the Philadelphia Eagles from 1998 to 2004 and was selected to the Pro Bowl as the NFC's special teamer in 2004.  He recorded 198 tackles, 6.5 sacks, and two interceptions during his time with the Eagles.

Reese signed with the Atlanta Falcons before the 2005 season.  He spent two years with the Falcons posting 44 tackles.  On March 2, 2007 the Falcons released him.

Broadcasting career
In 2008, Reese began hosting Ike at Night evenings on 610 WIP Sportsradio in Philadelphia. In 2009, Reese became Howard Eskin's co-host in the 3-7PM time slot forming the Afternoons with Howard Eskin & Ike Reese Show and became the Saturday night sports anchor for KYW-TV/WPSG-TV Philadelphia.  In 2011, Ike was paired with Michael Barkann on the new 94 WIP to host the Midday show, Mike and Ike, from 10AM-1PM. He currently is the co-host of the Marks and Reese show with Jon Marks and Jack Fritz on WIP, which airs from 2PM-6PM.

References

External links

1973 births
Living people
American football linebackers
Michigan State Spartans football players
Philadelphia Eagles players
Atlanta Falcons players
National Conference Pro Bowl players
National Football League announcers
People from Jacksonville, North Carolina
American sports radio personalities
Players of American football from North Carolina
Players of American football from Cincinnati
Radio personalities from Philadelphia
Woodward High School (Cincinnati, Ohio) alumni